Jack Heath is an Australian writer of fiction for children and adults who is best known for the Danger, Scream, Liars and Timothy Blake series. He has been shortlisted for the ACT Book of the Year Award, CBCA Notable Book Award, Nottinghamshire Brilliant Book Award, the Aurealis Sci-Fi book of the Year, the National Year of Reading "Our Story" Collection, a Young Australians Best Book Award, a Kids Own Australian Literature Award and the Australian of the Year Award. He lives in Gungahlin, Canberra.

Genre and style
Heath's young adult novels are mysteries, characterised by the frequent juxtaposition of elaborate action set pieces and moral philosophy. They usually include science fiction technologies or settings, and are almost always set in an ambiguous location.

As a public figure
Heath was featured in the Shanghai World Expo and spent a year reading only books by women in an effort to raise the profile of female authors.

Books

Stand-alone novels
Ink, Inc. (Dec 2013)
Replica (Aug 2014)
Kill Your Brother (July 2021)

The Liars series

The Truth App (1 Sep 2018)
No Survivors (also published as The Missing Passenger, 1 Dec 2018)
The Set Up (1 March 2019)
Lockdown (1 June 2019)
Armageddon (1 Sep 2019)

The Fero Files 
The Cut Out (Aug 2015) – a Children's Book Council of Australia notable book and shortlisted for the Aurealis Award for Best Children's Fiction Novel
The Fail Safe (Sep 2016) - a Children's Book Council of Australia notable book, shortlisted for ACT Book of the Year

The Danger Series
300 Minutes Of Danger (Sep 2016) - a Children's Book Council of Australia notable book 
400 Minutes Of Danger (Aug 2017)
500 Minutes Of Danger (Aug 2018)
200 Minutes Of Danger (Feb 2020)

Countdown to Danger/Choose Your Destiny
Countdown to Danger: Bullet Train Disaster (Feb 2011)
Countdown to Danger: Shock wave (May 2012)
Countdown to Danger: Deadly Heist (Feb 2013)

The Scream Series 
 Human Flytrap (May 2019)
 Spider Army (May 2019)
 Haunted Book (Aug 2019)
 Squid Slayer (Aug 2019)

Ashley Arthur series 
Money Run (2008) – shortlisted for the Nottinghamshire Brilliant Book Award
Hit List (2010) – shortlisted for the National Year of Reading "Our Story" Collection, a YABBA and a KOALA

Six of Hearts series
The Lab (2006)
Remote Control (2007) – shortlisted for the Aurealis Award for Best Science-Fiction Novel
Third Transmission (2009) – excerpt published in The Invisible Thread: One Hundred Years of Words
Dead Man Running (2012)

Timothy Blake series
Hangman (Jan 2018)
Hunter (also published as Just One Bite, Mar 2019)
Hideout (Dec 2020)
Headcase (Nov 2022)

Short stories
Sleep (published in Voiceworks, issue #65), 2006
The Mistress (published in Voiceworks, issue #68), 2007
Right-angles and hair (published in The Sex Mook), 2007 
Emma (published in lip, issue #16), 2008
404 (published on jackheath.com.au), 2008
Freak Show (published by the State Library of Queensland), 2008
The Beach (written for Salon 3 – Stoker and Shelley, and published on Tara Moss's blog, The Book Post), 2009
Method Living, 2010
Flesh (written for Salon 5 – Pinol and Wells, and published on The Book Post), 2010
The Caretakers, 2011

References

External links 
Jack Heath's official website

1986 births
21st-century Australian novelists
Australian male novelists
Australian male short story writers
Living people
21st-century Australian short story writers
21st-century Australian male writers
Writers from Canberra
Writers from the Australian Capital Territory